was a district located in Shiga Prefecture, Japan.

On October 1, 2001, Rittō Town was elevated to city status to become Rittō City; therefore, Kurita District was dissolved as a result of this change of status. Historically, Kusatsu City belonged to Kurita District, too.

Former districts of Shiga Prefecture